Four Compositions (Solo, Duo & Trio) 1982/1988 is an album by American composer and saxophonist Anthony Braxton recorded in 1982 and 1988 and released on the hatART label in 1989.

Reception
The AllMusic review by Brian Olewnick awarded the album 4 stars stating "Overall, this is one of the better recorded examples of the non-jazz area of Braxton's sound-world and is highly recommended to adventurous listeners".

Track listing
All compositions by Anthony Braxton.

 "Composition 101" – 16:59 
 "Composition 139" – 12:35 
 "Composition 99b [+97C, 117E, 117H, 118H]" – 7:45 
 "Composition 107: A" – 4:23 
 "Composition 107: B" – 5:02 
 "Composition 107: C" – 9:08 
 "Composition 107: D" – 7:32 
 "Composition 107: E" – 5:05 
Recorded at Tonstudio Bauer in Ludwigsburg, West Germany on April 6, 1982 (tacks 4–8) and at Haus der Begegnung Mariahilf in Vienna, Austra on November 18, 1988 (tracks 1 & 3) and November 19, 1988 (track 2)

Personnel
Anthony Braxton – sopranino saxophone, Soprano saxophone, alto saxophone (tracks 1, & 3–8)
Marianne Schroeder – piano (tracks 1, 2 & 4–8) 
Garrett List – trombone (tracks 4–8)

References

Hathut Records albums
Anthony Braxton albums
1989 albums